Joseph R. Kainrad (May 29, 1933 – August 5, 2015) was an American politician and judge who served in the Ohio House of Representatives from Portage County, Ohio.

References

1933 births
Democratic Party members of the Ohio House of Representatives
2015 deaths